The Archdiocesan Shrine of Santo Niño de Midsayap is the parish and archdiocesan shrine located in Midsayap, North Cotabato. It is under the ecclesiastical jurisdiction of the Roman Catholic Archdiocese of Cotabato. Santo Niño Parish is the oldest parish church established by the missionary congregation of the Oblates of Mary Immaculate in 1939.

History
The pioneering OMI priests took over the missionary territory of Cotabato which includes Midsayap which during that time covers Midsayap, Libungan, Pigcawayan, Alamada and Aleosan. It was initiated by a French-Canadian Oblate priest, Rev. Fr. Egide Beaudin, OMI to fortify the evangelization of Christian settlers in the locality who were mostly coming from Visayas and Luzon who dreamed of living in Mindanao - the so-called Land of Promise. Fr. Beaudin made frequent contacts with the faithfuls where in just a few months of his work, he was able to learn the Cebuano language, earning him as a lovable and jubilant fatherly figure. Fr. Gil as he was fondly called by the people, Beaudin got enormous help from the people which made it possible to construct a worship place earnestly dedicated to the Child Jesus to whom most Cebuano settlers adored from their hometown of Cebu where He is highly revered. They were able to celebrate their first ever fiesta immediately to highlight the success of completing the church.

Fr. Beaudin was given full support by fellow missionaries to continue the missionary zeal of spreading the Gospel even to the harshest stations such as Cotabato populated my majority Muslim and Islam adhering Filipinos.

When the Second World War broke in 1941, the flourishing mission parish of Santo Niño was closed as worldwide turmoil reached Mindanao by invading Japanese forces. Foreign missionaries including the Oblates were put to concentration camps in the University of Santo Tomas and the University of the Philippines in Los Baños, Laguna.

After the war, the OMI priests went back to Midsayap to pursue the missioning to its people. American oblates took over the management of their mission stations including schools. Rev. Fr. Cuthbert B. Billman, OMI became the parish priest from 1945–1946. He was followed by Rev. Fr. Robert E. Sullivan, OMI from 1947-1948 which was also the time when the oblates established the first Notre Dame school in the Asia, the Notre Dame of Midsayap College. From 1949–1950, the parish was under Rev. Fr. Joseph Billman, OMI and assisted by Rev. Fr. Edward Gordon, OMI and Rev. Fr. Francis McSorley, OMI (who was later appointed as bishop-prelate of the Apostolic Vicariate of Jolo which covers the whole provinces of Sulu and Tawi-Tawi). In 1951–1952, Rev. Fr. Joseph Baynes, OMI took charge of the parish with the help from a pioneering Filipino oblate priest, Rev. Fr. Natalio Tabada, OMI who, during that time was being trained to parish management so that Filipino clergyman will soon become parish priests themselves.

In the years 1953–1954, Rev. Fr. Jan Kuilboer, OMI took the challenge of managing the parish assisted by a Filipino, Rev. Fr. Crisonogo Echavez, OMI. Another Filipino oblate, Rev. Fr. Santos Mendoza, OMI became the priest in charge in 1955. He was followed in 1956 by a highly spirited American, Rev. Fr. Philip Smith, OMI who later became bishop of Cotabato, subsequently promoted to become a metropolitan archbishop when Cotabato was elevated into an archdiocese.

Archbishop Philip Smith, OMI was then followed by fellow oblates who served Midsayap for one year namely; Rev. Cyril Canning, OMI assisted by Rev. Fr. Andrew Horgan, OMI in 1957, Rev. Fr. Matthew Casey, OMI in 1958; Rev. Andrew Horgan, OMI assisted by Rev. Jan Kuilboer, OMI and Rev. Fr. Clarence Bertelsman in 1959. From 1960–1961, Rev. Fr. Charles Prass, OMI became parish priest with the help from Rev. Fr. Benedicto Carreon, OMI (who later worked for Mindanao Cross in Cotabato City and Radio Veritas in Manila) and Rev. Fr. John Nep Chai, OMI. They were replaced by Rev. Fr. Thomas Lenert, OMI as parish priest and Rev. Fr. Francis Hickley, OMI and Rev. Ernest Sylvestre, OMI as assistants. Rev. Fr. George Baynes, OMI returned to Midsayap as parish priest and was assisted by another returnee, Rev. Fr. Natalio Tabada, OMI from 1964–1965. Rev. Fr. Justin Huelsing, OMI manage the parish in 1967-1967 followed by Rev. Fr. Jerome Jankord, OMI assisted by Rev. Maurice Hermann, OMI in 1968–1969.

During the 1970s, the OMI congregation deemed it was time to slowly turn over the parish to Filipino priests by assigning them to large parishes such as Santo Niño. From 1970–1974, Rev. Fr. Donald Mundy, OMI commissioned a young Filipino oblate priest, Rev. Fr. Amador T. Castillo, OMI to work out major expansions in the parish by creating new chapels in the outskirts and remote barrios of Midsayap and Aleosan(which is part of the parish during that time). From 1975–1977, an all-Filipino team of oblate priests took charge of the progressive parish with Rev. Fr. Elino Isip, OMI as parish priest and Rev. Fr. Eliseo Mercado, Jr., OMI (who later became president of Notre Dame University in Cotabato City), Rev. Fr. Manuel Mina, OMI, Rev. Fr. Carmelino Razon, OMI and Rev. Fr. Marcelino Andres, OMI comprising the team. For the last 2 years of the decade in 1978–1979, Rev. Fr. Antero Berboso, OMI became parish priest assisted by Rev. Fr. Amador T. Castillo, OMI and Rev. Fr. Doroteo Reyes, OMI (both became presidents of the Notre Dame of Midsayap College).

In 1980–1981, Rev. Fr. Carmilino Razon, OMI became parish priest assisted by Rev. Fr. Ignacio Rellin, OMI (who was later appointed president of the Notre Dame of Midsayap College), Rev. Fr. Raul Biasbas, OMI and Rev. Fr. Rey Roda, OMI (who was murdered in Sulu). Rev. Fr. Antero Berboso, OMI came back in 1981-1985 as parish priest with the help from Rev. Fr. Enrique Gonzales, OMI and Rev. Fr. Rey Roda, OMI. From 1986–1988, Rev. Fr. Nestor Silva, OMI and Rev. Fr. Prospero Gacis, OMI became parish priest and assistant priest, respectively. Rev. Fr. Danilo Sergio, OMI was chosen to manage Santo Niño Parsh from 1989-1991 and followed by Rev. Fr. Henry Carlos, OMI from 1992–1993.

The vibrant missionary post of the oblates was pointed to Rev. Fr. Ramon Vicente Quiogue, OMI as parish priest from 1993-1993 assisted by Rev. Fr. Alfonso Cariño, OMI and Rev. Fr. Henry Carlos, OMI. The following year of 1995, Rev. Fr. Carmelino Razon, OMI returned to Midsayap duly assisted by newly ordained Rev. Fr. Edmundo Santoto, OMI and Rev. Fr. Oscar Lucas, OMI. In 1996, Rev. Fr. Dennis Gui, OMI served Santo Niño for a year. The next year of 1997, we saw Rev. Fr. Eleno Balboa, OMI heading the parish with the assistance from Rev. Fr. Marcelino Andamon, OMI and Rev. Fr. Rizalde Orola, OMI. From 1998–2001, Rev. Fr. Chalie Inzon, OMI led the parish. For the period of 001–2006, Rev. Fr. Edmundo Santoyo, OMI assisted by Rev. Fr. Danilo Sergio, OMI and the younger Rev. Fr. Jay Virador, OMI triumphantly made large developments in the church renovation of the already old church. Another team of visionary priests replace them led by Rev. Fr. Lauro S. De Guia, OMI (presently the Provincial Superior of the Oblates of Mary Immaculate in the Philippines) assisted by Rev. Fr. Ronnie Gicalao, OMI expanded the growth of local church and created innovations to increase enthusiasm among the lay faithfuls. In 2008–2009, Rev. Fr. Gil Asilo, OMI became the parish priest of Midsayap. From, 2009–2012, the large parish was under the team headed by Rev. Fr. Rogelio Tabuada, OMI with the support from Rev. Romeo C. Marcelino, OMI, Rev. Fr. Gil Asilo, OMI and Rev. Fr. Amador T. Castillo, OMI.

From 2012 up to the present, as the ever-growing parish of Santo Niño is preparing for the celebration of its 75th year of existence, the priests in charge of this very important missionary achievement of the Oblates of Mary Immaculate is led by Rev. Fr. Rizalde Oroloa, OMI and enjoyed the support of the younger oblates, Rev. Heriberto C. Villas, OMI and Rev. Mark F. Pagente, OMI.

Highlights
 Santo Niño Parish is the favorite church for ordinations of the Oblates of Mary Immculate because of the parishioners strong support (both logistics and financial) for these occasions.
 The parish was officially declared as an Archdiocesan Shrine of Santo Niño de Midsayap last January 2013 enjoying the status of greater propagation and devotion for faithfuls and devotees from any place.
 The parish has one of the most number of chapels covering most of the barangays of Midsayap and part of Northern Kabuntalan municipality in Maguindanao.

References
 https://www.youtube.com/watch?v=QPV9LosdEhk
 http://www.omiphil.org

Buildings and structures in Cotabato
Roman Catholic churches in Cotabato
Roman Catholic shrines